"Heroes" is the third single from Shinedown's second album, Us and Them. It reached number 4 on the U.S. Mainstream Rock chart and number 28 on the U.S. Modern Rock chart.

Chart performance

References

2006 singles
Shinedown songs
Songs written by Brent Smith
2005 songs
Songs written by Tony Battaglia
Atlantic Records singles